"Love of My Life" is 2001 single by the American R&B singer Brian McKnight from his album Superhero. The song peaked at number 51 on the Billboard Hot 100 and number 11 on the R&B/Hip-Hop chart.

In popular culture
In an episode of Season 3  of The Parkers, "Crazy Love", Professor Stanley Oglevee (played by Dorien Wilson) was lip-syncing the song when he was trying to seduce Nikki Parker (played by Mo'Nique) with the help of Brian McKnight (playing himself in the episode).

Charts

Weekly charts

Year-end charts

References

2001 singles
Brian McKnight songs
Songs written by Brian McKnight
Motown singles
2001 songs